Jean Émile Auguste Bernard (28 November 1843 – 11 September 1902) was a French Romantic composer and organist.

Bernard was born in Marseille and studied at the Paris Conservatoire; his organ teacher was François Benoist and his piano teacher was Antoine François Marmontel. He was organist at the Notre Dame des Champs from 1885 until his retirement in 1895.  He died in Paris.

His Fantasy and Fugue won the 1877 prize of the Société de Compositeurs de Paris. His Violin Concerto was dedicated to and performed by Pablo de Sarasate in 1895 at the Conservatoire. Other works include a Suite for Violin and Piano, a Concertstück for Piano and Orchestra, a Rondo for Cello and Orchestra, and a Divertissement for Doubled Wind Quintet (Op. 36) which was first written for the Société des Instruments à Vent.

Media

References

External links

1843 births
1902 deaths
19th-century classical composers
19th-century French composers
19th-century French male musicians
19th-century organists
Conservatoire de Paris alumni
French classical organists
French male classical composers
French Romantic composers
French male organists
Musicians from Marseille
20th-century French male musicians
Male classical organists